The Wurmberg ski jumps were a group of ski jumps  in the Harz, near the town of Braunlage in Lower Saxony, central Germany.

Wurmberg Ski Jump 
The Wurmberg Ski Jump was the largest jump in the Harz and is located at the summit of the Wurmberg.

It was built in 1922 as a 40 metre jump. During the Cold War there were ski jumping competitions here even though the Inner German Border with the former East Germany lay only a few metres beyond the landing area. In 1951 the 40 metre jump was converted. It was upgraded in 1984 into an 80 metre jump. In 1991 it was extended into an 83 metre jump. During the last rebuilding of the jump in 2001/2002 it was completely replaced and upgraded into a 90 metre jump. The new metal inrun (heatable), with glass and ceramic lamination, offered all jumpers the same conditions down the run. Starting in 1996, when there was enough snow, the FIS held its annual international ski jumping competition, the Continental Cup, here. In August 2014 it was dismantled due to advanced rust in the steel framework which had made it unsafe to use. It is not being replaced; instead an observation tower will be built on the site.

Ski jump records

Brockenweg Ski Jumps 

At the foot of the Wurmberg are the Brockenweg Ski Jumps which host regional and international competitions.

See also 
 List of ski jumping hills

References

External links 
 
 WSV Braunlage 
 Continental Cup Braunlage 
 Wurmberg Ski Jump at the ski jumping archives (Sprungschanzenarchiv) 
 Brockenweg Ski Jump at the ski jumping archives (Sprungschanzenarchiv) 

Buildings and structures in the Harz
Ski jumping venues in Germany
Braunlage
Sports venues in Lower Saxony
Buildings and structures in Goslar (district)